Laisné is a surname of Belgian origin, a variant of Lainé. Notable people with the surname include:
, French architect of Gap Cathedral and other works
Étienne Laisné (1905-1997), French racewalker
Jeanne Laisné (born 1456), French heroine better known as Jeanne Hachette
Jeanne Laisné (soprano) (born 1879), French opera singer
Kinnie Laisné (born 1989), French tennis player

References

Surnames of Belgian origin